Integral energy is the amount of energy required to remove water from soil with an initial water content  to water content of  (where ). It is calculated by integrating the water retention curve, soil water potential  with respect to :

It is proposed by Minasny and McBratney (2003) as alternative to available water capacity. (AWC)
The AWC concept assumes equal availability of water between two potentials and does not consider the path along the water retention curve. Integral energy takes into the account the path or energy (characterised by water retention curve) required to dry a soil at particular soil moisture content

See also
Available water capacity
Nonlimiting water range

References
Minasny, B., McBratney, A.B., 2003. Integral energy as a measure of soil-water availability. Plant and Soil 249(2), 253-262.

Soil physics